Hannibal Regional Airport  is a public use airport in Marion County, Missouri, United States. It is located four nautical miles (7 km) northwest of the central business district of Hannibal, Missouri, and is owned by the City of Hannibal. The airport is used for general aviation with no commercial airlines.

Although most U.S. airports use the same three-letter location identifier for the FAA and IATA, this airport is assigned HAE by the FAA but has no designation from the IATA.

History 
In 2003, the airport was renamed Hannibal Regional Airport, William P. Lear Field in honor of the inventor of the Lear Jet. It was originally known as Hannibal Municipal Airport.

Facilities and aircraft 
It has one runway designated 17/35 with a concrete surface measuring 4,400 by 100 feet (1,341 x 30 m) with a concrete surface. Runway 17/35 has Runway End Identifier Lights (REIL) and Precision Approach Path Indicator (PAPI) lights on each runway end.

The airport originally had an asphalt runway that was  x  with no parallel taxiway.  In 2002 the airport was completely shut down for almost 6 months while the old runway and apron were completely removed and a new concrete runway (4,400 x 100 ft.) was constructed.  In addition to the new runway, a concrete full-length parallel taxiway was constructed, the apron was re-constructed with concrete, and a new hangar area was constructed.

Beginning in 2008, the airport's Fixed-Base Operator (FBO) is Mike Barron of Barron Aviation Private Flight Services.  Prior to that, Rodney Hilton managed the airport.

For the 12-month period ending August 9, 2007, the airport had 4,700 aircraft operations, an average of 12 per day: 79% general aviation and 21% air taxi. At that time there were 20 aircraft based at this airport: 90% single-engine, 5% multi-engine and 5% helicopter.

Plans 
The plans include extending the runway to 5,000 to allow small jets to use the airport. In addition, a new terminal building is planned for the airport.

References

External links 
 Hannibal Regional Airport, official site
 Aerial photo as of 13 April 1995 from USGS The National Map
 
 

Airports in Missouri
Buildings and structures in Marion County, Missouri